Floris Maarten Alphons Maria Evers (born 26 February 1983 in Tilburg, North Brabant) is a field hockey player from the Netherlands, who won the silver medal with the Dutch national team at the 2004 Summer Olympics and at the 2012 Summer Olympics. He was the captain of the team at the 2012 Summer Olympics. He has played in all the top leagues the world of field hockey. After the London Olympics, along with Teun de Noijer, he retired from international hockey. In 2013, he played with the Ranchi Rhinos in the Indian hockey league.

Club career
He played most of his career for Amsterdam where he announced his retirement in 2015. Since 2006, Evers had been playing at Amsterdam, with which he became the national champion in 2011 and 2012. Before that, he played for Groningen, Hattem and Stichtsche.

References

External links
 

1983 births
Living people
Dutch male field hockey players
Olympic field hockey players of the Netherlands
Field hockey players at the 2004 Summer Olympics
Olympic silver medalists for the Netherlands
Sportspeople from Tilburg
Olympic medalists in field hockey
Field hockey players at the 2012 Summer Olympics
Medalists at the 2012 Summer Olympics
Medalists at the 2004 Summer Olympics
2006 Men's Hockey World Cup players
SCHC players
Amsterdamsche Hockey & Bandy Club players
Hockey India League players
2010 Men's Hockey World Cup players
20th-century Dutch people
21st-century Dutch people